Sport psychology was defined by the European Federation of Sport in 1996, as the study of the psychological basis, processes, and effects of sport. Otherwise, sport is considered as any physical activity where the individuals engage for competition and health. Sport psychology is recognized as an interdisciplinary science that draws on knowledge from many related fields including biomechanics, physiology, kinesiology and psychology. It involves the study of how psychological factors affect performance and how participation in sport and exercise affect psychological and physical factors. Sport psychologists teach cognitive and behavioral strategies to athletes in order to improve their experience and performance in sports. In addition to instruction and training of psychological skills for performance improvement, applied sport psychology may include work with athletes, coaches, and parents regarding injury, rehabilitation, communication, team building, and career transitions.

History of sport psychology

Early history
In its formation, sport psychology was primarily the domain of physical educators, not researchers, which can explain the lack of a consistent history.  Nonetheless, many instructors sought to explain the various phenomena associated with physical activity and developed sport psychology laboratories.

The birth of sport psychology in Europe happened largely in Germany. The first sport psychology laboratory was founded by Dr. Carl Diem in Berlin, in the early 1920s. The early years of sport psychology were also highlighted by the formation of the Deutsche Hochschule für Leibesübungen (College of Physical Education) in Berlin Germany by Robert Werner Schulte in 1920. The lab measured physical abilities and aptitude in sport, and in 1921, Schulte published Body and Mind in Sport. In Russia, sport psychology experiments began as early as 1925 at institutes of physical culture in Moscow and Leningrad, and formal sport psychology departments were formed around 1930. However, it was a bit later during the Cold War period (1946–1989) that numerous sport science programs were formed, due to the military competitiveness between the Soviet Union and the United States, and as a result of attempts to increase the Olympic medal numbers. The Americans felt that their sport performances were inadequate and very disappointing compared to the ones of the Soviets, so this led them to invest more in the methods that could ameliorate their athletes performance, and made them have a greater interest on the subject. The advancement of sport psychology was more deliberate in the Soviet Union and the Eastern countries, due to the creation of sports institutes where sport psychologists played an important role.

In North America, early years of sport psychology included isolated studies of motor behavior, social facilitation, and habit formation. During the 1890s, E. W. Scripture conducted a range of behavioral experiments, including measuring the reaction time of runners, thought time in school children, and the accuracy of an orchestra conductor's baton. Despite Scripture's previous experiments, the first recognized sport psychology study was carried out by an American psychologist Norman Triplett, in 1898. The work of Norman Triplett demonstrated that bicyclists were more likely to cycle faster with a pacemaker or a competitor, which has been foundational in the literature of social psychology and social facilitation. He wrote about his findings in what was regarded as the first scientific paper on sport psychology, titled "The Dynamogenic Factors in Pacemaking and Competition", which was published in 1898, in the American Journal of Psychology. Research by ornithologists Lashley and Watson on the learning curve for novice archers provided a robust template for future habit formation research, as they argued that humans would have higher levels of motivation to achieve in a task like archery compared to a mundane task. Researchers Albert Johanson and Joseph Holmes tested baseball player Babe Ruth in 1921, as reported by sportswriter Hugh S. Fullerton. Ruth's swing speed, his breathing right before hitting a baseball, his coordination and rapidity of wrist movement, and his reaction time were all measured, with the researchers concluding that Ruth's talent could be attributed in part to motor skills and reflexes that were well above those of the average person.

The field of sport psychology in general began in the 1960s with the formation of the International Society of Sport Psychology in 1965, The North American Society for the Psychology of Sport and Physical Activity in 1967, and The Canadian Society for Psychomotor Learning and Sport Psychology in 1969. Sport psychology started in 1890 when Norman Triplett performed the first experiment in sport psychology and the social facilitation phenomenon. Then 1925 Coleman Griffith created the Athletic Research Laboratory at the University of Illinois. Later in 1930 the Soviet Union employed sport psychology during the Cold War. In 1960 sports psychology becomes part of the USA and expanded to the whole world. In 1986 the American Psychological Association recognized Sport psychology as a branch of Psychology and in 1993 British Psychology Society formed a sport and exercise psychology section.

Characteristics of Behavioral Sport Psychology 
The first characteristic of behavioral sport psychology involves identifying target behaviors of athletes and/or coaches to be improved, defining those behaviors in a way so that they can be reliably measured, and using changes in the behavioral measure as the best indicator of the extent to which the recipient of an intervention is being helped (Martin, 2011).

A second characteristic is that behavioral psychology treatment procedures and techniques are based on the principles and procedures of Pavlovian (or respondent) and operant conditioning and are ways of rearranging the stimuli that occur as antecedents and consequences of an athlete’s behavior.

The third characteristic of behavioral sport psychology is that many of the interventions with athletes have been developed by practitioners with a cognitive–behavioral orientation. Cognitive–behavior therapy typically focuses on cognitive processes frequently referred to as believing, thinking, expecting, and perceiving.

The fourth characteristic of this approach is that researchers have relied heavily on the use of single-subject research designs to evaluate interventions in sport settings, including the following:

(a) a focus on individual athletic performance across several practices and/or competitions;

(b) acceptability by athletes and coaches because no control group is needed, few participants are needed, and sooner or later all participants receive the intervention;

(c) easy adaptability to assess a variety of interventions in practices and/or competitions; and

(d) effectiveness assessed through direct measures of sport-specific behaviors or outcomes of behaviors.

The fifth characteristic of a behavioral approach is to place a high value on accountability for everyone involved in the design, implementation, and evaluation of an intervention (Martin & Pear, 2011).

Social validation in sports psychology 
In ABA, the term social validation refers to procedures to ensure that the techniques employed by a practitioner are selected and applied in the best interests of the clients.

In behavioral sport psychology, social validation requires that the practitioner constantly seek answers to three questions: (a) What do the athletes (and perhaps the coach and parents) think about the goals of the intervention? (b) What do they think about the procedures recommended by the practitioner? (c) What do they think about the results produced by those procedures? Also, behavioral sport psychologists need to be aware of and behave consistently with the set of ethical principles to guide the actions of sport psychologists published in 1995 by the Association for the Advancement of Applied Sport Psychology, which, in 2006, became the Association for Applied Sport Psychology (AASP).

Skill acquisition 
Each sport requires different range of skills. Knapp (1963) defined skills as the learned ability to bring pre-determined results with maximum certainty, often with the minimum outlay of time, energy or both. As we develop a skill, the error is diminished. An ability describes our innate physical attributes that determine our potential for a given sport.

Coleman Griffith: "America's first sport psychologist"
Coleman Griffith worked as an American professor of educational psychology at the University of Illinois where he first performed comprehensive research and applied sport psychology. He performed causal studies on vision and attention of basketball and soccer players, and was interested in their reaction times, muscular tension and relaxation, and mental awareness. Griffith began his work in 1925 studying the psychology of sport at the University of Illinois funded by the Research in Athletics Laboratory. Until the laboratory's closing in 1932, he conducted research and practiced sport psychology in the field. The laboratory was used for the study of sport psychology; where different factors that influence athletic performance and the physiological and psychological requirements of sport competitions were investigated. He then transmitted his findings to coaches, and helped advance the knowledge of psychology and physiology on sports performance. Griffith also published two major works during this time: The Psychology of Coaching (1926) and The Psychology of Athletics (1928).             
Coleman Griffith was also the first person to describe the job of sport psychologists and talk about the main tasks that they should be capable of carrying out. He mentioned this in his work "Psychology and its relation to athletic competition", which was published in 1925. One of the tasks was to teach the younger and unskilled coaches the psychological principles that were used by the more successful and experienced coaches. The other task was to adapt psychological knowledge to sport, and the last task was to use the scientific method and the laboratory for the purpose of discovering new facts and principles that can aid other professionals in the domain.

In 1938, Griffith returned to the sporting world to serve as a sport psychologist consultant for the Chicago Cubs. Hired by Philip Wrigley for $1,500, Griffith examined a range of factors such as: ability, personality, leadership, skill learning, and social psychological factors related to performance. Griffith made rigorous analyses of players while also making suggestions for improving practice effectiveness. Griffith also made several recommendations to Mr. Wrigley, including a "psychology clinic" for managers, coaches, and senior players. Wrigley offered a full-time position as a sport psychologist to Griffith but he declined the offer to focus on his son's high school education.

Coleman Griffith made numerous contributions to the field of sport psychology, but most notable was his belief that field studies (such as athlete and coach interviews) could provide a more thorough understanding of how psychological principles play out in competitive situations. Griffith devoted himself to rigorous research, and also published for both applied and academic audiences, noting that the applicability of sport psychology research was equally important with the generation of knowledge. Finally, Griffith recognized that sport psychology promoted performance enhancement and personal growth.

In 1923, Griffith developed and taught the first sport psychology university courses ("Psychology and Athletics") at the University of Illinois, and he came to be known as "The Father of Sport Psychology" in the United States, as a result of his pioneering achievements in that area. However, he is also known as "The prophet without disciples", since none of his students continued with sport psychology, and his work started to receive attention only from the 1960s

Renewed growth and emergence as a discipline

Early Researchers 
Franklin M. Henry was a researcher who had a positive influence on sport psychology. In 1938, he began to study how different factors in sport psychology can affect athlete's motor skills. He also investigated how high altitudes can have an effect on exercise and performance, aeroembolism, and decompression sickness, and studies on kinesthetic perception, learning of motor skills, and neuromuscular reaction were carried out in his laboratory. In 1964, he wrote a paper "Physical Education: An Academic Discipline", that helped further advance sport psychology, and began to give it its scholarly and scientific shape. Additionally, he published over 120 articles, was a board member of various journals, and received many awards and acclaims for his contributions.

In 1979, Rainer Martens published an article entitled "About Smocks and Jocks", in which he contended that it was difficult to apply specific laboratory research to sporting situations. For instance, how can the pressure of shooting a foul shot in front of 12,000 screaming fans be duplicated in the lab? Martens contended: "I have grave doubts that isolated psychological studies which manipulate a few variables, attempting to uncover the effects of X on Y, can be cumulative to form a coherent picture of human behavior. I sense that the elegant control achieved in laboratory research is such that all meaning is drained from the experimental situation. The external validity of laboratory studies is at best limited to predicting behavior in other laboratories." Martens urged researchers to get out of the laboratory and onto the field to meet athletes and coaches on their own turf. Martens' article spurred an increased interest in qualitative research methods in sport psychology, such as the seminal article "Mental Links to Excellence."

The First Sport Psychology Organizations 
Given the relatively free travel of information amongst European practitioners, sport psychology flourished first in Europe, where in 1965, a meeting was organized by Ferruccio Antonelli, a sport psychologist living in Italy. The meeting was held in Rome, Italy and some 450 professionals primarily from Europe, Australia, and the Americas attended. It became known as the First World Congress of Sport Psychology and gave rise to the International Society of Sport Psychology (ISSP). The ISSP became a prominent sport psychology organization after the Third World Congress of Sport Psychology in 1973, and still exists today as the only international organization that is focused solely on the promotion of sport psychology. Additionally, the European Federation of Sport Psychology, or FEPSAC (Fédération Européenne de Psychologie des Sports et des Activités Corporelles) was formed following a similar meeting known as the first European Congress of sport in 1969, and has since held 15 congresses to discuss the future of sport psychology in Europe.

In North America, support for sport psychology grew out of physical education, and In 1973, The North American Society for the Psychology of Sport and Physical Activity (NASPSPA) grew from being an interest group to a full-fledged organization, whose mission included promoting the research and teaching of motor behavior and the psychology of sport and exercise. In Canada, the Canadian Society for Psychomotor Learning and Sport Psychology (SCAPPS) was founded in 1977 to promote the study and exchange of ideas in the fields of motor behavior and sport psychology. These two organizations would go on to be the leading sources of collaboration among scientists in sport psychology, and in 1985, the NASPSPA became the first organization in North America to sponsor a journal in sport psychology, when the previously unaffiliated The Journal of Sport Psychology, which was founded in 1979, became The Journal of Sport and Exercise Psychology. Also during this same time period, over 500 members of the American Psychological Association (APA) signed a petition to create Division 47 in 1986, which is focused the collaboration between researchers in the field of Exercise and Sport Psychology.

In 1985, several applied sport psychology practitioners, headed by John Silva, believed an organization was needed to focus on professional issues in sport psychology, and therefore formed the Association for the Advancement of Applied Sport Psychology (AAASP). This was done in response to NASPSPA voting not to address applied issues and to keep their focus on research.

Following its stated goal of promoting the science and practice of applied sport psychology, AAASP quickly worked to develop uniform standards of practice, highlighted by the development of an ethical code for its members in the 1990s. The development of the AAASP Certified Consultant (CC-AAASP) program helped bring standardization to the training required to practice applied sport psychology, and in 2007, AAASP dropped "Advancement" from its name to become the Association for Applied Sport Psychology (AASP), as it is currently known.

AASP 
AASP aims to provide leadership for the development of theory, research and applied practice in sport, exercise, and health psychology. However, in 2010 a rift developed between members who would like the organization to function as a trade group that promotes the CC-AASP certificate and pushes for job development, and those who would prefer the organization to remain as a professional society and a forum to exchange research and practice ideas. These problems were illustrated in AASP founding president John Silva's address at the 2010 conference. Silva highlighted five points necessary for AASP and the greater field of applied sport psychology to address in the near future:

 Orderly development and advancement of the practice of sport psychology
 Embrace and enhance interdisciplinary nature of sport psychology
 Advance development of graduate education and training in sport psychology
 Advance job opportunities for practice in collegiate, Olympic, and pro sports
 Be member-driven and service its membership

Silva then suggested that AASP advance the legal standing of the term "sport psychology consultant" and adopt one educative model for the collegiate and post-graduate training of sport psychology consultants. While the AASP Certified Consultant (CC-AASP) certification provides a legitimate pathway to post-graduate training, it does not legally bar an individual without the CC-AASP credentials from practicing sport psychology. Silva contended that future sport psychology professionals should have degrees in both psychology and the sport sciences and that their training ultimately conclude in the obtainment of a legal title. It was argued this should increase the likelihood of clients receiving competent service as practitioners will have received training in both the "sport" and "psychology" pieces of sport psychology. Silva concluded that AASP and APA work together to create legal protection for the term "sport psychology consultant," and 2018, the AASP updated its certification program and launched the Certified Mental Performance Consultant (CMPC).  However, as of 2020 no legal status for the required training to practice sport psychology has been obtained by either the AASP or APA.

Debate over the professionalization of sport psychology 
Although the AASP has recently dealt with problems regarding the legal requirements for practicing sport psychology, there has been debate over the professionalization of sport psychology for quite some time. The professionalization of the discipline started to become visible at the Olympic games in 1984 when the Olympic teams began to hire sport psychologists for their athletes, and in 1985, when the U.S. team employed their first permanent sport psychologist. For the Summer Olympics in 1996, the U.S. already had over 20 sport psychologists working with their athletes. Psychological research into sport and exercise was being used to inform the training regiments of high level athletes for the first time.

As Rainer Martens argued for applied methods in sport psychology research, the increasing emergence of practitioners of sport psychology (including sport psychology consultants who taught sport psychology skills and principles to athletes and coaches, and clinical and counseling psychologists who provided counseling and therapy to athletes) brought into focus two key questions and a debate which continues to the present day: under what category does the discipline of sport psychology fall?, and who governs the accepted practices for sport psychology? Is sport psychology a branch of kinesiology or sport and exercise science (like exercise physiology and athletic training)? Is it a branch of psychology or counseling? Or is it an independent discipline?

Danish and Hale (1981) contended that many clinical psychologists were using medical models of psychology to problematize sport problems as signs of mental illness instead of drawing upon the empirical knowledge base generated by sport psychology researchers, which in many cases indicated that sport problems were not signs of mental illness. Danish and Hale proposed that a human development model be used to structure research and applied practice. Heyman (1982) urged tolerance for multiple models (educative, motivational, developmental) of research and practice, while Dishman (1983) countered that the field needed to develop unique sport psychology models, instead of borrowing from educational and clinical psychology.

As the practice of sport psychology expanded throughout the 1980s and 1990s, some practitioners expressed concern that the field lacked uniformity and needed consistency to become "a good profession." The issues of graduate program accreditation and the uniform training of graduate students in sport psychology were considered by some to be necessary to promote the field of sport psychology, educate the public on what a sport psychologist does, and ensure an open job market for practitioners. However, Hale and Danish (1999) argued that accreditation of graduate programs was not necessary and did not guarantee uniformity. Instead, these authors proposed a special practicum in applied sport psychology that included greater contact hours with clients and closer supervision.

Applied Sport Psychology Today 
Applied sport and exercise psychology consists of instructing athletes, coaches, teams, exercisers, parents, fitness professionals, groups, and other performers on the psychological aspects of their sport or activity. The goal of applied practice is to optimize performance and enjoyment through the use of psychological skills and the use of psychometrics and psychological assessment. The practice of applied sport psychology is not legally restricted to individuals who possess one type of certification or licensure. The subject of "what exactly constitutes applied sport psychology and who can practice it?" has been debated amongst sport psychology professionals and to this day still lacks formal legal resolution in the United States. Some question the ability of professionals who possess only sport science or kinesiology training to practice "psychology" with clients, while others counter that clinical and counseling psychologists without training in sport science do not have the professional competency to work with athletes. However, this debate should not overshadow the reality that many professionals express the desire to work together to promote best practices among all practitioners, regardless of training or academic background.

There are different approaches that a sport psychologist can use while working with his clients. For example, the social-psychological approach focuses on the social environment and the individual's personality, and on how complex interactions between the two influence behavior. The psycho-physiological approach focuses on the processes of the brain and their influence on physical activity, and the cognitive-behavioral approach analyzes the ways in which individual thoughts determine behavior. Generally, there are two different types of sport psychologists that focus on athletes with emotional conditions: educational and clinical.

4 Key Aspects of Sports Psychology
Social identity is the basis for 4 specific aspects of sports psychology. These aspects are identified below:
1) Sports Group Behavior
       A person's sense of self adapts and is shaped by the interaction with group behaviors. Sense of self is therefore not entirely defined by the individual, but the interactions within the group, which is a key feature of the sport team dynamic. Defining this role of self then is used to assert a place within the success of the group.
2) Sports group Formation and Development
      Kindship and group membership exists in all sports, even running. Solidarity, comradery, and group formation help satisfy people's social development.
3) Sports Group Support and Stress Appraisal
       Social identity is structured within social self-categorization processes, which are developed within support and stress appraisal structures. Sport and team stress can be significant strain causing and/or coping mechanism development tool.
4) Sports Group Leadership
       Social identity with the previous three aspects contribute to social leadership development and interactions. Advancing beyond transactional theories of leadership, sport interactions more intersectional leadership styles.

Educational sport psychologists
Educational sport psychologists emphasize the use of psychological skills training (e.g., goal setting, imagery, energy management, self-talk) when working with clients by educating and instructing them on how to use these skills effectively during performance situations. The common goal of an educational sport psychologist is performance enhancement by teaching skills to athletes on how to manage the mental factors of sports to maximize potential. Sport psychologists also contribute to the performance of athletes by assisting them with challenges they may face as a result of participating in sports. These can include recovery from injury, plans for sticking to a training regimen, or help with dealing with the emotional strain of being in the public eye.

Clinical sport psychologist

Clinical psychologists obtain a doctoral degree in clinical or counseling psychology. They meet with athletes that have mental health issues and work to provide the mental health solutions they need both individually and in group settings. Areas of expertise include mainly clinical issues, which include but are not limited to depression, eating disorders, and substance abuse. If they possess a medical doctor degree or work in conjunction with a psychiatrist, they are also able to prescribe medications or other forms of treatment to address clinical issues. A non-clinical sport psychologist might refer one of their clients to a clinical psychologist if it is thought that the athlete might need additional help regarding their mental health. Many clinical sport psychologists simply apply their clinical expertise to athletes and are limited in their abilities to enhance performance.

Common areas of study
Listed below are broad areas of research in the field.  This is not a complete list of all topics, but rather, an overview of the types of issues and concepts sport psychologists study. Criticism of the quality, assumptions, and methods of sport psychology stress research has drawn increasing attention, and a flourishing academic debate has evolved regarding the quality of sport research its limitations and future directions.

Personality
One common area of study within sport psychology is the relationship between personality and performance. This research focuses on specific personality characteristics and how they are related to performance or other psychological variables. There are various personality characteristics that have been found to be consistent among elite athletes. These include but are not limited to mental toughness, self-efficacy, arousal, motivation, commitment, competitiveness, and control. Mental toughness is a psychological edge that helps one perform at a high level consistently.  Mentally tough athletes exhibit four characteristics: a strong self-belief (confidence) in their ability to perform well, an internal motivation to be successful, the ability to focus one's thoughts and feelings without distraction, and composure under pressure. Self-efficacy is a belief that one can successfully perform a specific task. In sport, self-efficacy has been conceptualized as sport-confidence.  However, efficacy beliefs are specific to a certain task (e.g., I believe I can successfully make both free throws), whereas confidence is a more general feeling (e.g., I believe I will have a good game today). Arousal refers to one's physiological and cognitive activation.  While many researchers have explored the relationship between arousal and performance, one unifying theory has not yet been developed.  However, research does suggest perception of arousal (i.e., as either good or bad) is related to performance. Motivation can be defined broadly as the will to perform a given task.  People who play or perform for internal reasons, such as enjoyment and satisfaction, are said to be intrinsically motivated, while people who play for external reasons, such as money or attention from others, are extrinsically motivated. Commitment refers to the dedication to continuing a sport from early development into a high level of sport expertise. Competitiveness is the ability to challenge opponents with an aim of success. Control is the ability to separate and focus on different events occurring in one's life, both within and outside of athletics. Additionally, there are specific psychological skills that are ingrained in personality that are possessed at higher levels in elite athletes than the typical person. These include arousal regulation, goal setting, imagery, pre-performance routines, and self-talk.

According to Hollander's Model (1971), it is thought that personality is made up of three dimensions: role-related behavior, typical responses, and psychological core. Role-related behaviors are the actions that a person exhibits when they are in a certain situation. These behaviors change frequently, so they are external and dynamic. Typical responses are the way a person usually acts as the result of an event. A person's psychological core refers to the morals, beliefs, and values they hold. This is not changed under various circumstances, so it is internal and constant. There are multiple approaches personality and how it is shaped.

The psychodynamic approach theory explores how the subconscious interacts with the conscience of an individual. It proposes that the underlying thoughts, feelings, and emotions influence how we think and act. The subconscious is closely related to experiences of resolution of conflict as a child. This theory emphasizes understanding the individual as a whole, rather than by each trait. This theory does not consider environmental factors that influence behavior.

The trait approach focuses on the traits that are commonly attributed to an individual and how they influence the way one will act on a normal basis. Traits are helpful in predicting usual behavior, however, they cannot always predispose situational behavior.

Situational approach suggests that how an individual will act entirely depends on the environment. For example, if a player acts aggressively on the playing field, they might not be this way off the field. This theory neglects individual traits and does not consider differences among people.

Interactional approach theory is a combination of trait and situational approach. It suggests that the traits commonly attributed to an individual predispose behavior, however, these traits will not influence behavior unless the situation calls for it. This theory is most commonly used by sport psychologists because it takes into consideration the components of each person and the situation at hand. The method of measuring personality involves assessing the traits, or typical style of behavior, versus state, the immediate emotion or behavior in the moment.

Athletic Performance
Sport psychology remains influential to athletic performance at all levels. Athletic performance can be measured by self-report or objective data (e.g. player/team statistics). Scholars currently prefer the use of self-reports or a combination of subjective and objective measurements, due to the many factors which go into athletic performance. For example, Athlete's Subjective Performance Scale (ASPS) has been developed and validated with objective data (player's statistics), and found to be a reliable tool for assessing athletic performance in team sports. Being mentally prepared has proven to help athlete's performance, however research has shown that elite athletes and coaches will be hesitant to seek out help from a sport psychologist even if they believed it could help. There are multiple key recommendations for mental practice which improve sport performance, such as practicing imagery and increasing mental and physical repetitions.

Youth sport
Youth sport refers to organized sports programs for children less than 18 years old.  Researchers in this area focus on the benefits or drawbacks of youth sport participation and how parents impact their children's experiences of sporting activities. There are multiple factors as to why youth sport is studied when researching sport psychology, such as life skills, burnout, parenting behavior and coach's behavior. These factors influence whether athlete's in youth sport are affected mentally, whether that be a positive or a negative. 

Life skills refer to the mental, emotional, behavioral, and social skills and resources developed through sport participation.  Research in this area focuses on how life skills are developed and transferred from sports to other areas in life (e.g., from tennis to school) and on program development and implementation. Burnout in sport is typically characterized as having three dimensions: emotional exhaustion, depersonalization, and a reduced sense of accomplishment.  Athletes who experience burnout may have different contributing factors, but the more frequent reasons include perfectionism, boredom, injuries, excessive pressure, and overtraining. Burnout is studied in many different athletic populations (e.g., coaches), but it is a major problem in youth sports and contributes to withdrawal from sport.  Parenting in youth sport is necessary and critical for young athletes. Research on parenting explores behaviors that contribute to or hinder children's participation. For example, research suggests children want their parents to provide support and become involved, but not give technical advice unless they are well-versed in the sport. Excessive demands from parents may also contribute to burnout. Coach behavior is a major contributor to how youth athletes experience sports. In research directed at coding behavioral styles of coaches, it has been found that children are more accurate at perceiving coaching behaviors than the coach. This lack of awareness contributes heavily to negative athlete behaviors and burnout.

Coaching

While sport psychologists primarily work with athletes and focus their research on improving athletic performance, coaches are another population where intervention can take place.  Researchers in this area focus on the kinds of things coaches can say or do to improve their coaching technique and their athletes' performance.

Motivational climate refers to the situational and environmental factors that influence individuals' goals. The two major types of motivational climates coaches can create are task-oriented and ego-oriented.  While winning is the overall goal of sports competitions regardless of the motivational climate, a task-orientation emphasizes building skill, improvement, giving complete effort, and mastering the task at hand (i.e., self-referenced goals), while an ego-orientation emphasizes demonstrating superior ability, competition, and does not promote effort or individual improvement (i.e., other-referenced goals). A task-oriented climate has been found to develop a greater intrinsic, self-determined motivation in athletes compared to an ego-oriented climate. Additionally, an environment with self-improvement as the primary focus creates greater intrinsic motivation than one with winning as the focus.

Effective coaching practices explore the best ways coaches can lead and teach their athletes.  For examples, researchers may study the most effective methods for giving feedback, rewarding and reinforcing behavior, communicating, and avoiding self-fulfilling prophecies in their athletes. Coaches influence motivation of athletes mainly through interactional behavior with athletes. Coaches can be perceived by their athletes as autonomy-supporting or controlling. Autonomy-supporting coaches provide structure, as well as being involved and caring towards the athletes. Coaches that are perceived to be controlling instill less intrinsic motivation in their athletes. Motivation is maximized when a coach is perceived to be autonomy-supporting, while providing a high level of training and instruction. Due to these findings, interventions that sport psychologist implement are focused in increasing autonomy-supportive behaviors of coaches.

Coaching philosophy refers to a set of beliefs intrinsic to a coach that guide his or her behavior and experience. The philosophy should facilitate self-awareness, prioritize coaching objectives, and be athlete-centered. Having a philosophy central to the individual will allow a coach to react more efficiently to fast-paced decisions during sports in a systematic and thoughtful way. A coach must be self-aware of their own values in order to monitor if these values align with their thoughts and actions. Often, getting feedback from trusted outside sources is helpful in developing this self-awareness. A coach must also determine and prioritize coaching objectives between winning, athlete well-being, and time outside of the sport. An athlete-centered philosophy emphasizes learning and improvement over winning, which puts the athlete development first. This philosophy should be dynamic as both societal and coaching experiences occur and change.

Mental Coaching is the most used technic to raise performance achievements by enhancing mental toughness. It is predominantly used with elite athletes and high achievers. The Global Performance Index is a tool developed to support this approach. This holistic philosophy (Mind- Body- Heart- Spirit) assesses quickly the mental Health of athletes while measuring their performance progresses.

Communication style is an important concept for sport psychologists to develop with coaches. Communication is a constant role for coaches directed towards athletes, parents, administrators, other coaches, media, and supporters. It mainly comes in the forms of speaking, writing, body language, and listening. Verbal communication occurs through spoken word; however, nonverbal communication contributes hugely to how people perceive a coaches communication. Non-verbal communication comes through actions, facial expressions, body position, and gestures. Coaches must be aware of the words, tone, and behaviors that they use. Research has found that athletes respond best to positive feedback, specific technical instruction, and general encouragement. Sport psychologists focus on developing coaching communication styles that are direct, complete, immediate, and clear, while also being supportive, specific to the athlete, and verbally and non-verbally congruent.

Coaches have become more open to the idea of having a good professional athlete–coach relationship. This relationship will be the basis for an effective performance setting.

Team processes
Sport psychologists may do consulting work or conduct research with entire teams.  This research focuses on team tendencies, issues, and beliefs at the group level, not at the individual level.

Team cohesion can be defined as a group's tendency to stick together while pursuing its objectives.  Team cohesion has two components: social cohesion (how well teammates like one another) and task cohesion (how well teammates work together to achieve their goal). Collective efficacy is a team's shared belief that they can or cannot accomplish a given task.  In other words, this is the team's belief about the level of competency they have to perform a task.  It is important to note that collective efficacy is an overall shared belief amongst team members and not merely the sum of individual self-efficacy beliefs. Leadership can be thought of as a behavioral process that influences team members towards achieving a common goal. Leadership in sports is pertinent because there are always leaders on a team (i.e., team captains, coaches, trainers).  Research on leadership studies characteristics of effective leaders and leadership development.

Organizational Sport Psychology 
Since the early 2000s, there has been a growing trend toward research and practice that better acknowledges the importance of creating sporting environments which enable people to thrive. Organizational sport psychology is a subfield of sport psychology that is dedicated to better understanding individual behavior and social processes in sport organizations to promote organizational functioning. The focus of organizational sport psychology is to develop knowledge that supports the development of optimally functioning sport organizations though the enhancement of day-to-day experiences for those that operate within their sphere of influence. This knowledge can be used in a variety of ways through interventions at the individual, group, or organizational level, and thus organizational sport psychology reflects a systems perspective for academic study and an increasingly necessary aspect of practitioner competency.

Motivation in sport

Motivation in field of psychology is loosely defined as the intensity and direction in which effort is applied. The direction of motivation refers to how one seeks out situations or if they avoid things that might be challenging. Intensity refers to how much effort one puts into any challenge or situation. Motivation is tied closely to personality and can be categorized as a personality trait. There are three general theories of motivation: participant/trait theory, situational theory, and interactional theory. These theories are similar to those of personality.

Participant/trait theory says motivation consists of the personality traits, desires, and goals of an athlete. For example, some athletes might be extremely competitive and have the desire to improve and win constantly. These athletes would be motivated by competition with themselves and others. Other theories state motivation depends on the situation and environment. For example, some athletes might not feel the desire to work hard when they are on their own, but are motivated by others watching them. Their motivation would be dependent on whether or not there are other people around.

The Interactional theory combines the ideas of participant/trait and situational, where the level of motivation of an individual depends on his/her traits and the situation at hand. For example, if an athlete might be intrinsically competitive and feels most motivated when participating in a match against many other people.

Depending on traits and situations, it can be easier for some individuals to find motivation than others. That being said, those who are able to find motivation more easily are not guaranteed success and athletes who struggle can adjust some things to improve their drive. Motivation can be facilitated by coaching or leaders, changing the environment, finding multiple reasons or motives to do something, and being realistic about what is achievable. High achieving athletes are more likely to be motivated to achieve success rather than being motivated to avoid failure.

Reversal theory of motivation states that all human behavior is experienced in eight states, four sets of two. A motivational state from each of the four pairs is present at any time. 
Reversal theory has supporting research connecting psychological and physiological phenomena to these states. Purposeful reversals from a less desired, or useful, state can increase performance and endurance. Arousal and stress may be utilized in a unique and helpful way with the use of this theoretical framework. The theory has been well supported in studies on several continents and in a variety of sports.

Recovery from Injury 
Sport psychologists may also deal with helping athletes recover from the psychological consequences resulting from injury. Because athletes, especially professionals, are more at risk to injury than other kinds of exercisers, the process of recovering from injury, and the varying effects of different kinds of injuries are an important component of sports psychology research. Additionally, sports psychologist are interested in the differences between athletes that may elicit a stronger psychological reaction to an injury, and who is most at risk for injury. For example, research has found men may be less likely to report concussions than women and could be at higher risk of injury due to their physiology. Regarding psychological outcomes, researchers are interested if the type of sport a person plays, how closely they identify with being an athlete, or the amount of time they have spent playing a sport can influence their mental health, and research also explores what types of mental health outcomes are associated with injury (fear, depression, stress, etc.). As of 2013, sport psychologists have also began to explore the effectiveness of various techniques such as setting goals during rehabilitation, self-talk, or biofeedback techniques.

Injury among athletes has also been proven to negatively impact their mental health. Especially with elite athletes who's job is to play a certain sport, there is a proven negative mental impact to having an injury and not being able to play the sport. There has been limited research in the past on how athletes deal with the burden of getting injured and not being able to play their sport, however the recent research which has been done has shown that injury has caused athletes to have worsening mental health such as depression and anxiety.

Burnout 
Research on athlete burnout has historically been focused on the physical load from training and competitions, in addition to the psychological stress associated with situational pressure to justify the occurrence of the burnout. Traditionally, burnout in athletes is explained by a strenuous work load that is needed to become competitive in sports, with the flip side of this strenuous work being the danger of failing to adapt to training loads, being injured, or ill and therefore experiencing performance issues. Research also claims that occurrence of burnout among athletes are rising, and an athlete's mental health is challenged when experiencing performance issues, injuries, or are ill. These result in potential situational stressors that result in stress related responses such as negative thoughts and emotions. Athlete burnout is explained as a result from an athlete's experienced or believed inability to meet demands in training and competitions, in which the distress is related to the discrepancy between the athlete's expectations to achieve goals and cope with demands.

The concept of athlete burnout is made up of three parts: physical and emotional exhaustion, reduced performance accomplishment, and sport devaluation. The core element, physical and emotional exhaustion, is characterized by fatigue from training and competitions. Reduced performance accomplishment is defined as focusing on the feeling of being unable to reach goals and succeed with training and/or competitions. Sport devaluation, the third aspect, is characterized by loss of interest and care for sports, which further results in reduced quality of performance.

Burnout can also be caused by continuous training and sport attention stress without physical and/or mental rest and recovery. It results in staleness, overtraining, and eventually burnout. Staleness is defined as a clear drop in athlete motivation and a plateau in performance. Overtrained athletes often show psychophysiological malfunctions and performance declines. Another factor that adds to burnout could be the feeling of being trapped by circumstances within a sport, which perpetuates the cycles of this burnout.

Coaches and athletes are also very dependent on not only results, but each other. If athletes believe that they are not being pushed, or the opposite, being pushed too hard, burnout is very possible and the drive to continue playing lowers. Also, because athletes are always striving to get to that next level in a sport, once an athlete reaches that level, it is shown that these athletes are more prone to becoming complacent and not feel the need to work as hard, or burning out. This can also happen to coaches at any level. The repetitions which coaches face and similarly to athletes, once they get to the highest level and win at the highest level, they are more prone to burning out because there is nothing in the sport which they have not achieved.

Identity Beyond Sports 
Identity is built off of one's self-perception of their physical, psychological, and interpersonal characteristics which are rooted in personal experiences, memories, and social influences. Athletic identity is defined as "the degree to which an individual identifies with the athlete role and looks to others for acknowledgement of that role." Athletic identity is developed through acquisition of skills, confidence, and social interaction during sport. Cognitively, it provides a framework for processing information, how an individual copes with career-threatening situations, and inspires behavior consistent with an athlete. The social role can be determined by the perceptions close to the athlete, like family, friends, and teammates. As a form of self-concept, athletic identity provides a way to evaluate competence or worth, which can influence self-esteem and motivation. After spending a majority of their lives training, earning recognition for athletic accomplishments, and integrating in the sports environment, the athletic identity becomes a key component of an individual's identity as a whole. Sports psychologists help empower athletes to explore and access other non-sports related identities in times of transition after the life as an athlete.

Some benefits of an athletic identity include having a strong sense of self in who an individual is, and increased self-confidence, discipline, and social interactions. There are also health and fitness benefits. Some consequences of a strong athletic identity include having emotional difficulties dealing with injuries because it usually results in inability to play or perform at peak performance, which could result in loss of confidence and increase feelings of helplessness. There can also be difficulty adjusting to life after the end of an athletic career. Since sports has been a source of self worth, it can become difficult to adjust to a life without sports for many athletes, especially those who peak at a young age. This can also lead to alternate career or educational options being considered because individuals with a strong athletic identity do not associate their identities with other activities. Having an overly strong athletic identity can also result in burnout due to overcommitment towards an individual's role as an athlete.

Having a strong athletic identity can have a very positive impact on athletes during their athletic career as this allows them to focus solely on their career and bettering themselves. When athletes who have a very strong athletic identity get injured and are sidelined away from the game, it can lead to anxiety, stress and depression because these athletes do not know who they are outside of the game they have been playing. This is the same with athletes who have retired and not known what to do because there whole lives have been about sports. Inversely, athletes can be optimistic about their future post-sports because they will have time to do activities which they never have been able to do before.

Self-Esteem 
Self-esteem is the confidence someone has in themselves and their abilities. This is why sport and physical activity as a whole has been proven to provide positive mental health benefits, such as more confidence and higher self-esteem. When athletes succeed in sport, they are more confident in their abilities and their self-worth as a result. Sport can also work inversely with self-esteem and cause athletes to feel worse about themselves. If someone is playing poorly then it is possible the athlete will end up thinking less of themselves and having lower self-worth. Playing sports in general, and doing some form of physical activity already immediately makes people think of themselves as more than which is shown by research.

Professional sports 
In professional sports, the role of a sports psychologist is subject to change. Roles can changed based on the employment of staff within the organization from management to coaching staff. Examples of services performed include: performance enhancement services, clinical or counseling services, psychological testing, and mindfulness training. Through performance enhancement services, psychologists help professional athletes with self-regulation to enhancing team cohesion. Sports psychologists in professional sports organizations also must be well trained in clinical or counseling psychology to help professional athletes deal with personal issues that occur off the field. Sports psychologists must also be trained in psychological testing which is generally used in pre-drafting situations as professional sports teams want to identify psychological factors that could negatively influence a draft candidate's potential. Mindfulness techniques are also a useful too for sports psychologists to utilize as mindfulness training has been linked with better performance in professional competition.

Commonly used techniques
Below are some of the more common techniques or skills sport psychologists teach to athletes for improving their performance and along with their mental health.

Arousal regulation
Arousal regulation refers to entering into and maintaining an optimal level of cognitive and physiological activation in order to maximize performance. This may include relaxation if one becomes too anxious or stressed through methods such as progressive muscle relaxation, deep breathing exercises, and meditation, or the use of energizing techniques (e.g., listening to music, energizing cues) if one is not alert enough. This may also include cognitive strategies of relaxation through methods of psychological preparation and positive self-talk.

Progressive muscle relaxation (PMR) refers to the progressive tensing and relaxing of target muscle groups, which can help lower blood pressure, reduce state anxiety, improve performance, and decrease stress hormones. This technique was developed by Edmund Jacobson, who found that people under stress typically displayed increased muscle tension. This technique requires athletes to feel the tension in a muscle group in order to recognize the subsequent relaxation. To successfully use this technique, athletes must allot about twenty to thirty minutes to the activity, tense each muscle group for about four to eight seconds, and ensure that controlled and deep breathing is also applied. It is important to note that this technique can increase feelings of fatigue. Although this technique is not well-suited as a pre-performance method of arousal regulation, it has been found that long-term regular practice can reduce state anxiety and sports-related pain, which is often exacerbated by anxiety.

Deep breathing exercises involve the awareness of one’s rhythm of breath and the conscious effort to take slow, deep breaths. Slow deep breathing is a traditional practice in Eastern culture, yoga, and meditation. It is used to activate the parasympathetic nervous system, which helps reduce blood pressure and heart rate. The typical respiratory rate in humans is between 10 and 20 breaths per minute, while slow breathing is between the range of 4-10 breaths per minute. There are various methods to apply slow breathing, such as the 4-7-8 technique. The simplest form is deeply breathing for 1–5 minutes at a slow pace. To enhance the effects, individuals may utilize diaphragmatic breathing simultaneously. To do so, an individual inhales through the nose, allowing his or her belly to rise as the lungs fill. Then, after a momentary pause, release the breath slowly through the mouth or nose. Along with its physiological use, there is evidence that deep breathing can increase a sense of relaxation and reduce anxiety. A study on competitive swimmers found that regular practice of deep breathing exercises can improve lung functions by increasing respiratory endurance.

The use of meditation and specifically, mindfulness, is a growing practice in the field of arousal recognition. The Mindfulness-Acceptance-Commitment (MAC) Theory is the most common form of mindfulness in sport and was formed in 2001. The aim of MAC is to maximize human potential for a rich, full and meaningful life. It includes specific protocol that involve meditation and acceptance practices on a regular basis as well as before and during competition. These protocol have been tested various times using NCAA men's and women's basketball players. In a study done by Frank L. Gardner, an NCAA women's basketball player increased her personal satisfaction in her performances from 2.4 out of 10 to 9.2 out of 10 after performing the specific MAC protocol for several weeks. Also, the effect of mental barriers on her game decreased from 8 out of 8 to 2.2 out of 8 during that same time period as a result of the MAC protocol.

Another study of the MAC protocol performed by Frank Gardner and Zella Moore on an adolescent competitive diver showed that when the MAC protocol is tailored to a specific population, it has the potential to provide performance enhancement. In this case, the vocabulary and examples in the protocol were tailored to be more practical for a 12-year-old. After performed the MAC protocol for several weeks, the diver showed between a 13 to 14 percent increase in his diving scores.  This finding is important because previously the majority of tests performed using the MAC protocol had been on world class athletes.

Arousal anxiety and stress

Although anxiety or stress are often believed to a negative thing, they are actually a necessary response for the body to survive. It is natural for the body to exhibit certain levels of anxiety and stress, however, it becomes a problem when it begins to inhibit activity. Arousal is the physiological and psychological activation of the body in response to an event. Trait anxiety exists in an individual when they experience unusually high response levels to a wide spread of situations that are not threatening. State anxiety is the momentary feeling of nervousness or worry that accompanies the arousal of the body. State anxiety can be defined cognitively, where nervous thoughts and worries occur for a moment. There is also somatic state anxiety, where the body experiences a physiological response to arousal. This sometimes manifests momentarily as a fluttering in the stomach or an elevated pulse. There are four major theories of arousal and anxiety.

Drive theory is an approach that considers anxiety to be a positive asset. In situations where anxiety is high, performance increases proportionally. This theory is not well accepted because it is thought that athletes can be psyched up, but they can also be psyched out. This simply means anxiety can work to motivated some, but it can inhibit others. It is entirely dependent on the individual's personality, so it can not be broadly applied to all athletes.

Inverted U theory is an approach that proposes that the best performance occurs when stress is moderate (not too high or low). This idea is demonstrated in a graph where physiological arousal is plotted against performance. The curve resembles and inverted U because the performance is at its highest value where the arousal is at half of its highest value.

The zone of optimal functioning theory looks at each type each athlete and what level of arousal they need to perform best. This suggests that each athlete requires their own level of stress and arousal to feel motivated and perform well. This theory is specific but difficult to quantify. One proposed model for optimal functioning was proposed by Yuri Hanin. This model focuses on the interaction between natural emotional experience and the repetition of athletics. The combination of these concepts creates an emotional pattern that is stable to each individual. It takes into account positive, negative, optimal, and dysfunctional emotional experiences and how they effect athletic performance. Peak performance is when an athlete experiences this zone of optimal functioning. This stage is described as including dissociation and intense concentration to the point of being unaware of one's surroundings, lack of fatigue and pain, perceptual time-slowing, and feeling power and control. This state cannot be forced to happen, although athletes can develop control over several psychological variables that contribute to achieving peak performance. Sport psychologists try to give athletes the tools to have more control over reaching this peak performance level. These interventions targets controlling state anxiety and arousal level for the individual and task needs to maximize performance abilities. Some of the strategies used include cognitive reappraisal, breathing and relaxation, and hypnosis.

Practice-Specificity-Based Model of Arousal 
The "Practice-Specificity-Based Model of Arousal" (Movahedi, 2007) holds that, for best and peak performances to occur, athletes need only to create an arousal level similar to the one they have experienced throughout training sessions. For peak performance, athletes do not need to have high or low arousal levels. It is important that they create the same level of arousal throughout training sessions and competition. In other words, high levels of arousal can be beneficial if athletes experience such heightened levels of arousal during some consecutive training sessions. Similarly, low levels of arousal can be beneficial if athletes experience such low levels of arousal during some consecutive training sessions.

Goal setting
Goal setting is the process of systematically planning ways to achieve specific accomplishments within a certain amount of time. Research suggests that goals should be specific, measurable, difficult but attainable, time-based, written down, and a combination of short-term and long-term goals.  A meta-analysis of goal setting in sport suggests that when compared to setting no goals or "do your best" goals, setting the above types of goals is an effective method for improving performance. According to Dr. Eva V. Monsma, short-term goals should be used to help achieve long-term goals. Dr. Monsma also states that it is important to "set goals in positive terms by focusing on behaviors that should be present rather than those that should be absent." Each long-term goal should also have a series of short-term goals that progress in difficulty. For instance, short-term goals should progress from those that are easy to achieve to those that are more challenging. Having challenging short-term goals will remove the repetitiveness of easy goals and will give one an edge when striving for their long-term goals. There are three major types of goals within sport psychology: outcome goals, performance goals, and process goals.

Types of goals 
Outcome goals describe how an individual or team aim to compare to the other competitors. This type of goal is unique because of its nature being ingrained in social comparison. Winning is the most common outcome goal. This type of goal is the least effective because it depends on so many factors that are extrinsic to the individual.

Performance goals are subjective goals that are concerned with personal achievement in an end result. These products of performance are based on standard that is subjective for the individual and usually based on numeric measurements. Examples include finishing a race in a certain time, jumping a certain height, or completing a specific amount of repetitions.

Process goals are focused on the process of performance. These include execution of behaviors used in the activity of getting to the final product of performance. Examples include breathing control, maintaining body posture, or use of imagery.

Imagery
Imagery (or motor imagery) can be defined as using multiple senses to create or recreate experiences in one's mind.  Additionally, the more vivid images are, the more likely they are to be interpreted by the brain as identical to the actual event, which increases the effectiveness of mental practice with imagery. Good imagery, therefore, attempts to create as lifelike an image as possible through the use of multiple senses (e.g., sight, smell, kinesthetic), proper timing, perspective, and accurate portrayal of the task.  Both anecdotal evidence from athletes and research findings suggest imagery is an effective tool to enhance performance and psychological states relevant to performance (e.g., confidence). This is a concept commonly used by coaches and athletes the day before an event. There are two perspectives one can take when using imagery: first person, where one pictures doing the skill his/her self, and third person imagery, where one pictures watching the skill be done by his/her self or another athlete. Athletes can use whichever perspective is most comfortable for them. There are multiple theories of how athletes use imagery.

Psychoneuromuscular theory proposes that athletes activate the muscles associated with an action by picturing themselves doing the action. Activating the neurons that provide input to the muscles is similar to actually practicing the motion.

Symbolic learning theory proposes that athletes recognize patterns in activities and performance. The patterns are then used to create a mental map or model of how to do completes a series of actions.

Vividness theory suggests that athletes use the five senses to take in information while completing an action, and then using the memories of these stimuli to make their mental recreation of the event as realistic as possible.

Controllability theory focuses on the ability of athletes to manipulate images in their mind. This way, they are able to picture themselves correcting a mistake or doing something properly. This is thought to make goals seem more attainable to athletes. This type of imagery can also be harmful, where athletes visualize themselves making a mistake repeatedly.

All strategies of imagery are functional, but each athlete might find one more effective than others. Each strategy can be utilized based on the individual needs and goals of the athlete. In order to be effective, the practice of imagery needs to be inculcated into regular routines as a supplement to physical training. Athletes must learn how to use imagery in a quiet, non-distracting place while picturing realistic and attainable images. Using trigger words can facilitate imagery and bring the athlete closer to the pictured goal.

Pre performance routines
Pre performance routines refer to the actions and behaviors athletes use to prepare for a game or performance. This includes pregame routines, warm up routines, and actions an athlete will regularly do, mentally and physically, before they execute the performance. Frequently, these will incorporate other commonly used techniques, such as imagery or self-talk. Examples would be visualizations done by skiers, dribbling by basketball players at the foul line, and preshot routines golfers or baseball players use prior to a shot or pitch. These routines help to develop consistency and predictability for the player. This allows the muscles and mind to develop better motor control. 

Pre performance routines allow an athletes mind to relax and go back to something which they know to calm them down. This has resulted in lowering athlete's anxiety and increase their self-belief, which as a result will increase athletic performance because of the lowered anxiety and stress prior to the actual event. For example, when a batter in baseball is up to bat, a lot of the athletes will re-grip their batting gloves, and take a couple of practice swings, not because they need the practice, but because that routine is familiar and will allow them to clear their mind and relax their anxiety.

Self-talk
Self-talk refers to the thoughts and words athletes and performers say to themselves, usually in their minds.  Self-talk phrases (or cues) are used to direct attention towards a particular thing in order to improve focus or are used alongside other techniques to facilitate their effectiveness. These uses are typically fit into two categories of self-talk: instructional and motivational. Instructional self-talk refers to cues that an athlete might use to focus and remind oneself of proper technique. For example, a softball player may think "release point" when at bat to direct her attention, while a golfer may say "smooth stroke" before putting to stay relaxed. Motivational self-talk signifies cues that might build confidence, maximize effort, or reaffirm one’s abilities. For example, one might tell themselves to “give it all” or that “I can do it.”  Research suggests either positive or negative self-talk may improve performance, suggesting the effectiveness of self-talk phrases depends on how the phrase is interpreted by the individual. However, the use of positive self-talk is considered to be more efficacious and is consistent with the associative network theory of Gordon Bower and the self-efficacy tenet within the broader social cognitive theory of Albert Bandura. The use of words in sport has been widely utilized. The ability to bombard the unconscious mind with one single positive phrase, is one of the most effective and easy to use psychological skills available to any athlete.

Biofeedback 
Biofeedback uses external technology to measure and make an individual aware of internal physiological processes. There is some evidence that physiological measures, such as heart rate or brain waves, appear to be different in elite athletes than that of the typical person. This is a field that should be further looked into; however, it could have beneficial implications for athletes to be able to monitor and control these physiological measures to maximize performance.

Modeling 
Modeling is a form of observational learning where an athlete observes another individual  around the same level of skill learning perform sport related movements and receive feedback. This has been shown help modify athletes' thoughts, emotions, and behaviors in beneficial ways. In order for this form of learning to work the athlete must be motivated, attentive, able to recall, and willing to try to mimic their observation of the model.

Music 
Music can be used a valuable strategy to help athletes manage arousal levels to increase performance outcomes. Music can be sedative or stimulating. First, music can be sedative by mitigating somatic state anxiety. For instance, unfamiliar relaxing music, unfamiliar arousing music, and familiar arousing music were all shown to have an effect on physiological parameters: galvanic skin response, peripheral temperature, and heart rate. However, in a particular study unfamiliar relaxing music decreased arousal levels more than the other two types of selected music.

Music can be used as a stimulant as well. Athletes will listen to music to get them to an optimal arousal level. Additionally, athletes listen to music to prepare for (or “get into the mood of”) events. Music influences arousal levels through the activation of the prefrontal cortex which has a direct influence on the emotional state of an individual. Moreover, it was found that listening to music increases the release of dopamine which illustrates a rewarding component of listening to music. If athletes want to change arousal levels, they should be aware of the effect tempo has on arousal levels. For instance, athletes should listen to fast tempo music instead of slow tempo music to achieve higher arousal levels. Lastly, music is effective in managing arousal by shifting athlete’s attention inward, preventing the athlete from giving into outside distractions that could lead to higher arousal and impact performance negatively.

Sport-specific differences

Personality characteristics 
It is beneficial for sport psychologists to understand how athlete personalities systematically vary depending on type of sport played. Research on athlete personalities allows professionals to put in the maximum investment and select specific sports due to a background understanding of the dynamic that they are intervening in. Personality characteristics differ between team versus individual sports, as well as different types of sports.

Big 5 personality traits 
Research on the big five personality traits (openness, conscientiousness, extraversion, agreeableness, and neuroticism) as well as some other characteristics have differentiated personalities of athletes in individual sports compared to team sports. Athletes in individual sports scored higher on measures of conscientiousness and autonomy. Team-sport athletes scored higher on measures of agreeableness and sociotrophy. These characteristics can be explained by the demands of each sport type. Individual sports require athletes to be self-reliant, while team sports require group cohesion in order to be successful. Athletes participating in both team and individual sports score equally on measures of neuroticism, extraversion, and openness. These traits help provide a personality profile for sport psychologist seeking to work with certain types of sports.

Sensation seeking 
Sensation seeking is a phenomenon where an individual seeks to participate in novel, complex or intense activities with higher amounts of thrill in order to satisfy their personal need for arousal. This is one area where personalities in different types of sports can be differentiated. High sensation seekers tend to participate in the high-thrill extreme sports, such as sky diving, car racing, scuba diving, whitewater sports, and skiing. Sensation seeking is not a motive for other high-risk sports such as mountaineering and Ocean rowing. The high-thrill sports involve intense speed and excitement as well as a perception of risk. Individuals with a moderate level of sensation seeking tend to participate in common sports that are unpredictable but also minimally risky. Some examples are basketball, baseball, volleyball, and golf. Low sensation seekers participate in sports that require large amounts of training and consistency, such as long-distance running, gymnastics, or swimming. This is one area of personality type that differs for different sports.

Psychopathology 
Different categories of sports display different mental health profiles. Overall, female athletes are more likely to develop a psychopathology, such as anxiety, depression, or eating disorders. The only problem that is more prevalent in male athletes is drug and alcohol use. These are consistent with the general public, as well. Anxiety, depression, and sleep problems are most prevalent in highly aesthetic sports, such as ballet or gymnastics. These are least prevalent in high risk sports and team ball sports. Eating disorders are more prevalent in athletes than the general public. For women eating disorders are highly prevalent in aesthetic, racing, and fine motor sports, and least prevalent in team ball sports. Eating disorders are most prevalent for men in high combat and contact sports. There are more problematic eating behaviors in sports that place and emphasis on thinness and weight-dependence. This demonstrates that mental health problems are highly related to the demands that specific sports place on the athletes involved.

Exercise psychology 
Exercise psychology can be defined as the study of psychological issues and theories related to exercise. Exercise psychology is a sub-discipline within the field of psychology and is typically grouped with sport psychology.  For example, Division 47 of the APA is for exercise and sport psychology, not just one or the other, while organizations like AASP encompass both exercise and sport psychology. However, Division 47 also recognizes that it is important to distinguish between sport and exercise psychology, as any definition that encompasses both disciplines would be too broad to account for the nuances in each.

The link between exercise and psychology has long been recognized.  In 1899, William James discussed the importance of exercise, writing it was needed to "furnish the background of sanity, serenity...and make us good-humored and easy of approach."  Other researchers noted the connection between exercise and depression, concluding a moderate amount of exercise was more helpful than no exercise in symptom improvement. Additionally, meeting exercise requirements can also aid in alleviating symptoms of avoidance disorders and anxiety, while also providing a higher quality of life for the patient in terms of physical health.

As a sub-discipline, the amount of research in exercise psychology increased in the 1950s and 1960s, leading to several presentations at the second gathering of the International Society of Sport Psychology in 1968. Throughout the 1970s and 1980s, William Morgan wrote several pieces on the relationship between exercise and various topics, such as mood, anxiety, and adherence to exercise programs.  Morgan also went on to found APA Division 47 in 1986.

As an interdisciplinary subject, exercise psychology draws on several different scientific fields, ranging from psychology to physiology to neuroscience.  Major topics of study are the relationship between exercise and mental health (e.g., stress, affect, self-esteem), interventions that promote physical activity, exploring exercise patterns in different populations (e.g., the elderly, the obese), theories of behavior change, and problems associated with exercise (e.g., injury, eating disorders, exercise addiction).

Recent evidence also suggests that besides mental health and well-being, sport practice can improve general cognitive abilities. When requiring sufficient cognitive demands, physical activity seems to be an optimal way to improve cognition, possibly more efficiently than cognitive training or physical exercise alone

See also
 Athletic training
 Clinical psychology
 Counseling psychology
 Exercise physiology
 Ideokinesis
 Kinesiology
 Performance psychology
 Personal training
 Sociology of sport
 Sport communication
 Sports medicine
 Sports science

References

External links
 Association for Applied Sport Psychology (AASP)
 Division 47: Exercise and Sport Psychology (APA47) of the American Psychological Association (APA)
 North American Society for the Psychology of Sport and Physical Activity (NASPSPA)
 European Federation of Sport Psychology (FEPSAC)
 International Society of Sport Psychology (ISSP)
 The British Association of Sport and Exercises Sciences (BASES)
 Canadian Society for Psychomotor Learning and Sport Psychology (SCAPPS)
 Asian South Pacific Association of Sport Psychology (ASPASP)